Mohan Prasad Sharma (16 December 1934 – 19 January 2022) was a Nepalese judge who served as 12th Chief Justice of Nepal, in office from 13 April 1998 to 15 December 1999. He was appointed by the then-king of Nepal, Birendra. Sharma was preceded by Om Bhakta Shrestha and succeeded by Keshav Prasad Upadhyaya. He died on 19 January 2022, at the age of 87.

References 

1934 births
2022 deaths
Chief justices of Nepal
People from Kathmandu